Nogoyá is a city in the province of Entre Ríos, Argentina. It lies in the southwest of the province, by the Nogoyá Stream (a tributary of the Paraná River), about 95 km southeast from the provincial capital Paraná, on National Route 12.

The main economic activity in the area is the dairy industry (producing milk and cheese), which makes Nogoyá the unofficial dairy capital in Entre Ríos. Agriculture is also significant, featuring wheat, corn, sorghum, sunflower and soybean crops.

History

The town started as an informal settlement by the Nogoyá River around 1760. Its name means "Wild Water". A chapel was built by Father Fernando Andrés Quiroga y Taboada to serve the region in 1782; this place of worship (today the Basilica of Nuestra Señora del Carmen) served as a focal point for more settlers, and is considered the foundational event of Nogoyá.

Nogoyá was recognized as a town in 1826. There is no exact date for the anniversary of the foundation, but locals observe City Celebration Day on July 16, the same day that Roman Catholics celebrate the Virgin under the invocation of "Nuestra Señora del Carmen;" She is considered the spiritual mother of the town. Every year, on July 16, the venerated image is taken out of the temple and carried by volunteers through the streets of Nogoyá, followed by thousands of pilgrims. At the end of her pilgrimage, it is returned to the Basilica receiving a salute of white tissues shaken in the air by the multitude. The image is honored with a special crown, called Alianza de las Alianzas ("alliance of alliances"), made of gold and jewelry, including wedding rings, offered up by settlers.

The brother of provincial caudillo Justo José de Urquiza, Cipriano Urquiza, was murdered in Nogoyá in 1844. Assigned its own Partido, or county, in 1849, and made its capital, the town was the seat of the Convention that reformed the Constitution of Entre Ríos in 1860. The Entre Ríos Central Railway arrived in Nogoyá in 1887.

A center of cattle ranching in the 19th century, the area around Nogoyá would be home to a growing number of dairy farms during the 20th. La Sibila, the largest dairy established in subsequent years, would grow to process over 1,000,000 liters of powdered milk a day, and remains the town's largest employer. Other important installations include a Molinos Río de la Plata mill, Nogopaint, and a microbrewery, Cerveza Nogoyá.

The city's economy was further bolstered by the 2003 completion of the Rosario-Victoria Bridge, giving Nogoyá a direct highway link to Rosario.

Notable natives
 Roque Alfaro (born 1956), football player and coach
 Fermín Chávez (1924–2004), historian
 Carlos Contín (1915–1991), Governor of Entre Ríos (1963–66) and Chairman of the UCR (1981–83)
 Juan Carlos Ghiano (born 1920), writer, essayist and playwright
 Raymundo Salvat (1881–1940), lawyer, author of the Treaty on Civil Law
 Luis María Sobrón (1932–2010), poet
 Juan León Solas (1787–1841), military governor of Entre Ríos
Emilia Mernes (b.1996), singer, songwriter, dancer and model.

Notes

References
 
 Portal of Nogoyá.
 Diario Nogoyá (the first local newspaper).
 Nogoyá at TurismoEntreRios.com.

Populated places in Entre Ríos Province
Populated places established in 1782
1782 establishments in the Viceroyalty of the Río de la Plata